Omoye is a 2017 Nigerian movie written and directed by Uche Chukwu. It was produced by Africa Magic Viewers Award Winner, Rotimi Salami with sponsorship from Natures Gentle Touch. Omoye's plot tackled one of the problems in the society; domestic violence and the movie is endorsed by the Lagos State Domestic and Sexual Violence Response Team (DSVRT). Also,  the movie stars Kiki Omeili, Tina Mba, Stan Nze, Rotimi Salami

Synopsis 
The movie tells the story of highly determined young lady who fell into the hand of an abuser as a husband. As the abuses continue, she becomes mentally and physically sapped but still did not give up on her marriage

Premiere   
The movie premiere was held on Sunday, October 22, 2017, at the Genesis Deluxe Cinema, Palms Shopping Mall, Lekki, Lagos.

Location 
The movie was shot in Ajegunle, Lagos State Nigeria.

Cast 
Kiki Omeili, Rotimi Salami, Stan Nze, Greg Ojefua, Olarotimi Fakunle, Omobola Akinde, Goodness Usman, Maryan Dike, Kelvinmary Ndukwe, Onyendika Ibeji and Evans Odiagbe.

References 

2017 films
Nigerian drama films
English-language Nigerian films